The 2023–24 Indian Super League will be the tenth season of the Indian Super League, the second season as the only top division, and the 28th season of top tier Indian football. It will be also the first season where the winners of 2022-23 I- League season will be promoted and participate in the league, thereby increasing the total number of participating clubs to 12. 

Mumbai City FC are the defending Premiers, having won the league in 2022-23 season and ATK Mohun Bagan are the defending Champions, having won the playoffs in 2022-23 season.

Teams 
A total of twelve (12) clubs wil be participating in the 2023–24 season. RoundGlass Punjab FC is the promoted team, having gained the promotion in the ISL by winning 2022-23 I-League, thereby becoming the first club to play in the ISL by winning the second-tier league, the I-League.

Stadiums and locations

See also
Indian club qualifiers for 2023–24 AFC competitions
2023–24 I-League
2023–24 I-League 2
2023 Super Cup
2022 Durand Cup

References

External links
 

Indian Super League
Indian Super League seasons
 
2023–24 in Indian football leagues